Ufuk University is a private university in Ankara, Turkey. The university was established by the Turkish Foundation of Traffic Accidents in 1999.

The university consists of Faculties of Medicine, Law, Education, Science-Literature (Statistics), Economics, Administrative and Social Sciences (Psychology, Management, Political Science and International Affairs, International Trade).

See also
 List of universities in Turkey

External links
 Ufuk University official website 

Educational institutions established in 1999
1999 establishments in Turkey